Finfer is a surname. Notable people with the surname include:

David Finfer (born 1942), American film editor
Stephen Finfer (born 1962), American music publisher, manager, attorney, television producer, and business executive

See also
Finger (surname)